Bruno Rosa (born 14 February 1986) is a Brazilian former professional tennis player.

Born and raised in Florianópolis, Rosa competed well on the ITF Junior Circuit and made it to as high as eight in the rankings, raising hopes that he could be the next Gustavo Kuerten for Brazil. In 2004 he featured in a Davis Cup tie for his country against Venezuela in Caracas and lost his singles rubber to Kepler Orellana. Following a limited time on the professional tour, in which he amassed a best world ranking of 402 and won two Futures titles, he chose to pursue studies in the United States. He played collegiate tennis for Rice University and was a two-time All-American.

ITF Futures titles

Singles: (2)

See also
List of Brazil Davis Cup team representatives

References

External links
 
 
 

1986 births
Living people
Brazilian male tennis players
Rice Owls men's tennis players
Sportspeople from Florianópolis
21st-century Brazilian people